Kelvin Jones may refer to:
 Kelvin Jones (soccer), American soccer player
 Kelvin Jones (singer), British–Zimbabwean singer-songwriter

See also
 Kevin Jones (disambiguation)